The 2004 Indian general election polls in Tamil Nadu were held for 39 seats in the state. The result was a victory for the Democratic Progressive Alliance, which included the United Progressive Alliance (UPA) and its allies the Left Front which won all 39 seats in the state. DMK and its allies were also able to hold on to Pondicherry, which has 1 seat, which allowed the UPA to win all 40 seats in Tamil Nadu and Pondicherry. The 2 larger partners Dravida Munnetra Kazhagam (DMK) (16) and Indian National Congress (INC) (10) won the majority of seats, with the junior partners Pattali Makkal Katchi (PMK) (5) and Marumaralarchi Dravida Munnetra Kazhagam (MDMK) (4) winning the rest. The remaining 4 seats were won by the Left Front parties. Due to the support of the Left Front for the government at the centre, all 39 seats in Tamil Nadu, supported the formation of the UPA-led government.

The DPA was formed, because DMK, PMK and MDMK, left the NDA mostly on the Ayodhya issue and created an alliance that supported the UPA. The NDA paid a price for it, when their BJP-AIADMK alliance couldn't even win a seat in this state.

Seat allotments

Democratic Progressive Alliance

National Democratic Alliance

People's alliance

Fourth front

Voting and results

Results by Pre-Poll Alliance

|-
! style="background-color:#E9E9E9" colspan=2 |Alliance/Party
! style="background-color:#E9E9E9;text-align:right;" |Seats won
! style="background-color:#E9E9E9;text-align:right;" |Change†
! style="background-color:#E9E9E9;text-align:right;" |Popular Vote
! style="background-color:#E9E9E9;text-align:right;" |Vote %
! style="background-color:#E9E9E9;text-align:right;" |Adj. %‡
|-
! colspan=2 style="text-align:center;vertical-align:middle;background-color:#009900; color:white"|UPA
| 39
| +15
| 16,483,390
| colspan=2 style="text-align:center;vertical-align:middle;"| 57.4%
|-
|DMK
! style="background-color: #FF0000" |
| 16 	 	 	
| +4
| 7,064,393
| 24.6%
| 58.2%
|-
|INC
! style="background-color: #00FFFF" |
| 10  	
| +8
| 4,134,255
| 14.4%
| 59.2%
|-
|PMK
! style="background-color: #800080" |
| 5  	
| –
| 1,927,367
| 6.7%
| 51.7%
|-
|MDMK
! style="background-color: #FF00FF" |
| 4  	
| –
| 1,679,870
| 5.9%
| 58.2%
|-
|CPI(M)
! style="background-color: #000080" |
| 2  	
| +1
| 824,524
| 2.9%
| 58.3%
|-
|CPI
! style="background-color: #0000FF" |
| 2  	
| +2
| 852,981
| 3.0%
| 51.8%
|-
! colspan=2 style="text-align:center;vertical-align:middle;background-color:#FF9933; color:white"|NDA
| 0
| -15
| 10,002,913
| colspan=2 style="text-align:center;vertical-align:middle;"| 34.8%
|-
|AIADMK
! style="background-color: " |
| 0  	
| -10
| 8,547,014
| 29.8%
| 35.6%
|-
|BJP
! style="background-color: " |
| 0  	
| -5
| 1,455,899
| 5.1%
| 31.0%
|-
! colspan=2 style="text-align:center;vertical-align:middle;background-color:gray; color:white"|Others
| 0
| –
| 2,228,212
| colspan=2 style="text-align:center;vertical-align:middle;"| 7.8%
|-
|JD(U)
! style="background-color: " |
| 0
| –
| 884,293 	
| 3.1%
| 9.8%
|-
|IND
! style="background-color: " |
| 0
| –
| 947,938 	
| 3.3%
| 
|-
| style="text-align:center;" |Total
! style="background-color: " |
| 39
| –
| 28,714,515
| 100%
| style="text-align:center;" | –
|-
|}
†: Seat change represents seats won in terms of the current alliances, which is considerably different from the last election. Also the seat change for BJP, includes the merged party MADMK, who won 1 seat in the last election.
‡: Vote % reflects the percentage of votes the party received compared to the entire electorate that voted in this election. Adjusted (Adj.) Vote %, reflects the % of votes the party received per constituency that they contested.
Sources: Election Commission of India

1999 vs. 2004 Alliance

 Note: UPA was not in existence in 1999, instead the number of seats won in 1999, represents the seats won by Indian National Congress and its allies.
 Note: INC affiliated parties, are parties that did not form an alliance or coalition with Congress party, but instead gave outside support.
 Note: Left front, whose parties were allies of DMK in Tamil Nadu, was not part of the UPA, in 2004, instead gave outside support.

List of Elected MPs

Source: NES Election 2004 Analysis

Post-election Union Council of Ministers from Tamil Nadu
Source: The Hindu
After the UPA victory in this election, Tamil Nadu was rewarded with 12 berths in Union Council of Ministers, with 6 cabinet berths, which is the most this state has ever received after an election. 7 of the Ministers were from DMK, 2 from PMK, while the rest were from Congress.

Cabinet Ministers

Ministers of State

See also 
 Elections in Tamil Nadu

References

External links
 https://web.archive.org/web/20081218010942/http://www.eci.gov.in/StatisticalReports/ElectionStatistics.asp
 https://web.archive.org/web/20090304134828/http://www.eci.gov.in/StatisticalReports/LS_2004/Vol_I_LS_2004.pdf
 https://web.archive.org/web/20090304123521/http://www.eci.gov.in/StatisticalReports/LS_1999/Vol_I_LS_99.pdf
 Website of Election Commission of India
 Volume I, 2004 Indian general election, 14th Lok Sabha
 

Tamil Nadu
Indian general elections in Tamil Nadu
2000s in Tamil Nadu